Jeonnam Dragons is a South Korean professional football club based in Gwangyang, South Korea, who currently play in the K League 2.

Jeonnam Dragons haven't won the Asia Champions League not yet, Jeonnam's best performance is runner-up of Asian Cup Winners Cup in 1999. Their most recent participation in the competition was in 2008.

Results

AFC Champions League

Asian Cup Winners' Cup

References

 Schedule & Results at AFC.com

External links
 AFC Champions League Official Page

Asian football
Jeonnam Dragons